My Boss is a 2012 Indian Malayalam-language romantic comedy drama film directed by Jeethu Joseph, starring Dileep and Mamta Mohandas in the lead roles and Mukesh in a cameo appearance. It is the third film by Jeethu Joseph. The film is produced by East Coast Vijayan under the banner of East Coast Communications. It was filmed in Mumbai and various locales in Kerala.

The film is inspired from the American film The Proposal (2009) starring Ryan Reynolds and Sandra Bullock, which included various dialogues and plot twists which adapted into the film 'My Boss'.

The film is set in the backdrop of the IT industry. The film follows Manu Varma (Dileep) who's hired as the executive assistant in a leading firm in Mumbai who aspires to migrate to a foreign country while Priya Nair (Mamtha Mohandas), his boss, an Indian-born Australian citizen has visa problems at a time when she has the opportunity to get a promotion. This leads Priya to get into a fake marriage with Manu to stay in India. My Boss released in Kerala on 13 November 2012, Diwali day to positive reviews and was declared a commercial hit. The film was remade in Kannada in 2014 as Software Ganda starring Jaggesh and Nikita Thukral, it is currently being remade in Tamil as Sandakkari in 2021 starring Vimal and Shriya Saran.

Plot
Manu Varma lands in Mumbai to join an IT firm, Quadra Infotech, as executive assistant to C.M.O Priya S. Nair (Mamta Mohandas). He has a BTech degree and passed with distinction in 2004 but has no work experience until 2012. Priya is shocked seeing his reports and his distinction and asks why chose this job; he says it's because of family problems. Manu's boss Priya, an Australian citizen, is a witch of a woman who verbally abuses her subordinates and criticizes them for the slightest mistakes. Manu works his heart out for three months under his cruel boss. He is ably supported by an 'all in one' errand boy, Ali. Manu gets his chance to hit back at his boss when she has visa issues and is expecting a promotion to company head.

Priya cooks up a story that she is in a relationship with Manu and they will soon get married. They act as lovers which leads to several comic scenes. Manu then gets approached by Priya's rival, Mathew Abraham, who is fighting for the same promotion. Matthew offers to help Manu as long as he keeps Priya away from the office for 30 days. Mathew also informs the immigration of Priya's fraud. The immigration officer warns Priya and Manu of the consequences of fraud marriages and they will investigate this matter thoroughly. Manu convinces Priya that she has to come to Kerala to meet his family so that the investigators will be convinced by Manu's family's statement. Manu takes his "bride" (to be) to his home in Kerala. Priya discovers that Manu's family is very rich with a palatial home and acres of farmland and that he has a loving mother and doting grandmother. He had left home because he had frequent fights with his father Thekkeppurakkal Prabhkara Varma, who was against Manu seeking a job and wanting to migrate to a western country. Gradually, Manu tries to convince his family that Priya is wife material by making her do traditional chores, thus taking his revenge on Priya as well. Manu's family asks him to stop the drama and accepts Priya into the family. However, Priya softens and falls in love with his family. Manu realizes that deep down Priya is soft-hearted and stops his revenge, much to the disappointment of Mathew. Things get out of hand when Manu's parents start planning a repeat wedding ceremony. Priya reveals that she is Manu's boss and the reason why they put up the act. This shocks Manu's parents. She apologizes and leaves for Mumbai without telling Manu.

Manu follows her to Mumbai and learns that she has resigned. Manu proposes to Priya which leaves her stunned. Manu apologizes and is about to leave when Priya pulls him back suddenly and kisses him.

Cast
 Dileep as Manu Varma
 Mamta Mohandas as Priya S. Nair
 Kalabhavan Shajon as Ali
 Sai Kumar as Prabhakara Varma, Manu Varma's father
 Seetha as Lakshmi, Manu's mother
 Valsala Menon as Manu's grandmother
 Jeevan Gopal as Rahul, Manu's nephew
 Mukesh as the Head of the IT Firm (extended cameo)
 Anand as Mathew Abraham
 Ganesh Kumar as Tom George, FRRO Officer
 Nisha Sarang as Sneha, Manu's colleague
 Soniya Rasheed as Jyothi, Priya's friend
 Rekha as Priya's mother (cameo)
 Dharmajan Bolgatty as Hotel owner (cameo)
 Abu Salim as Rowdy Vaasu (cameo)
 Sheela Sree as Rowdy Vasu's wife (cameo)
 Dinesh Prabhakar as auto-driver (cameo)
 Cherthala Lalitha as Mary (cameo)

Production
The film was launched on 23 April 2012, with a pooja ceremony organised at Sarovaram in Kochi. The film started production in May 2012, and the major locales were Mumbai and Alappuzha in Kerala.

Music
The soundtrack consists of 9 songs composed by Sejo John and M. Jayachandran. The audio was produced by East Coast.

Reception

Critical response
Sify.com gave the verdict "Masala Entertainer" and said, "With a brisk pace that barely gives much time to think, My Boss could be an entertaining affair, especially if you are not too bothered about the film’s inspirations and other nuances. This one is perhaps not meant to be taken too seriously and better enjoy this with a pack of popcorn!" The film is a copy of the Hollywood film The Proposal (2009) that had Sandra Bullock and Ryan Reynolds in the lead.

Box office
The film was one of the highest grossing Malayalam film of the year and commercial success, The film collected ₹14 crore and ran over 100 days in theatres.

References

External links
 

2012 films
2010s Malayalam-language films
2012 romantic comedy films
Indian romantic comedy films
Films directed by Jeethu Joseph
Malayalam films remade in other languages
Sham marriage